This is a list of National Football League (NFL) players who have led the regular season in forced fumbles each year. There are only 8 players who have led the league in forced fumbles in multiple seasons. Rickey Jackson currently holds the record for most seasons leading the league in forced fumbles with 4. There are only 7 other players who have managed to lead the league in forced fumbles multiple times, Robert Mathis with 3, and then 6 players having led the league twice each.

NFL annual forced fumble leaders

Table includes all seasons from 1981 up to the  season.

Multi-time leaders

See also 
 List of National Football League annual sacks leaders
 List of National Football League annual interceptions leaders
 List of National Football League records (individual)

References 

National Football League records and achievements
National Football League lists